Kauna Vagi (born 6 May 1976) is a Papua New Guinean cricketer. A right-handed batsman and right-arm medium pace bowler, he played for the Papua New Guinea national cricket team in the repêchage tournament of the 2005 ICC Trophy and in the ICC Trophy tournament itself, where he played his two List A matches.

References

1976 births
Living people
Papua New Guinean cricketers
People from the National Capital District (Papua New Guinea)